Jane Morris Rucker (January 29, 1830 – November 10, 1907) was a pioneer of Everett, Washington. She was the first female resident of Everett, coming to the area in 1889. Jane Rucker and two of her sons, Wyatt and Bethal, were among the largest landowners of the city. Wyatt and Bethal executed real estate dealings and were later known as the "Fathers of Everett," while Jane served as their partner and principal advisor.

The Ruckers were one of the first two landowners and non-indigenous inhabitants at the site of the future Everett City. They settled on the Port Gardner Peninsula (now central Everett) in 1890, bought a large amount of land, and engaged in platting the town of Port Gardner with other pioneers of the area. Later, the Ruckers joined forces with John D. Rockefeller, Charles L. Colby, and Colgate Hoyt. Plans for the town of Port Gardner were later folded into the City of Everett. The Rucker family owned  of downtown Everett and in 1891 they were the first to put the city's platted lots on the market. In 1905, the family moved into the Rucker Mansion, which would later be surrounded by other large residences that form the modern-day Rucker Hill neighborhood.

After Rucker's death, her sons built the Rucker Monument, which later became the family mausoleum in Everett's Evergreen Cemetery. Originally, the mausoleum was adorned with a seated statue of Jane Rucker.

Early life and family

Rucker was born in Ohio on January 29, 1830, to Moses Morris and Sarah Morris. Moses served as minister for more than 50 years. Both of the parents were pioneers from Ohio. Rucker married Wyatt Rucker, also the son of a long-time minister, in 1850. The Ruckers were members of the Baptist Church and had seven children, four girls and three boys.

Wyatt Rucker died on May 27, 1878, in Ohio and was buried there. On November 4, 1929, his remains were moved to the Rucker Mausoleum in Everett, Washington.

Pioneer life

Arriving in Everett

Jane Rucker and her two sons Wyatt and Bethel Rucker moved from Noble County, Ohio, to Tacoma, Washington in 1888.

In 1889, after James J. Hill's announcement that the Great Northern Railway would come over the Cascade Mountains to Puget Sound region, the excitement rose that it would also reach the Port Gardner Peninsula (an area formed by the Snohomish River and Port Gardner Bay, which later became a central part of the City of Everett). That same year, after reading about the opportunities for development of Snohomish County, the Ruckers moved to the peninsula. Jane Rucker also became the first female resident of Everett.

At the time of the Ruckers' arrival, the area mainly consisted of forests and was sparsely settled by Coast Salish peoples. There were no marked roads or merchant routes, and the primary way to get provisions to the area was by boat.

Developing Everett

By 1890, the family bought  of land on the Port Gardner peninsula (which later became Everett's downtown), becoming one of the first two non-indigenous landowners of the city's lands. They built their house there and started to plat the townsite of Port Gardner in partnership with William G. Swalwell, his brother Wellington, and Frank B. Friday.

Their plans for Port Gardner were interrupted by Henry Hewitt Jr., a lumberman and land speculator from Tacoma. He sought the establishment of an industrial city on a much larger scale. Hewitt invited John D. Rockefeller, American Steel Barge Company president Charles L. Colby, and Great Northern director Colgate Hoyt to invest in the area's development. After securing a funding agreement, he persuaded the Ruckers, Friday, and Swalwell to join the development scheme. They agreed to cooperate and each of them transferred half of their holdings (overall, near  of land) to the East Coast syndicate. Despite giving away a substantial part of their property, the Ruckers still ended up personally owning  of Everett's downtown and platted modern-day Rucker Hill. In 1891, they were the ones to put the first platted lots of Everett on the market and reaped a considerable profit from it.

In November 1890, the townsite was renamed Everett. The Everett Land Company was organized, spurring and managing all of the area's rapid development. The Rucker brothers were the company's co-founders and ran it for several years. 

Everett was incorporated as a city in 1893. It had its own infrastructure and enterprises and grew to 5,000 people. However, the Panic of 1893 and the national economic depression that came afterwards almost destroyed the city's businesses and infrastructure; many citizens fled the area. The city's government was almost bankrupt and additionally John Rockefeller started to withdraw his investments. The Rucker brothers took an active part in closing the deal between the businessmen.

In different accounts, Jane Rucker was described as "a woman of exceptional ability," "intelligent and independent," and was considered a partner and advisor in the business affairs of her sons. Wyatt and Bethel Rucker have since been recognized as Everett's founding fathers. 

The Ruckers also donated some of their property to house Everett's early factories and were involved in major city negotiations, such as the construction of a harbor. They owned the Monte Cristo Hotel and the park nearby, were in charge of the Everett and Monte Cristo Railway and of the Everett Terminal Company. They built a mountain resort, the Big Four Inn, had interests in several banking enterprises and commercial organizations, engaged in timber and mining businesses.

Later life in Everett 

In 1905, Jane Rucker, her two sons, and daughter-in-law moved into the Rucker Mansion on a hill overlooking Port Gardner Bay. The Ruckers attracted other elite families to the area, which was later known as Rucker Hill. Their residence became a setting point for a district of upper class homes that have since been preserved as a designated national historic district.

Personal life, family, and death

Rucker was a life member of the Woman's Book Club.

Rucker died on November 10, 1907, at the family mansion in Everett. She was outlived by her three sons – Wyatt J., Bethal J., William Rucker, and one of her daughters.

Historic legacy

Rucker Mausoleum

After Jane Rucker's death, her sons built a pyramid-shaped monument with a tomb inside in Evergreen Cemetery honoring their mother. It is considered to be the largest monument in the cemetery and "one of the grandest tombs in the country." At some point, Jane Rucker's large seated statue stood over the doorway, but it was dismantled. The inscription on the door of the mausoleum dedicated to Jane Rucker by her sons read "The Pioneer of Everett, The True Wife, The Perfect Mother, The Soul of Honor."

The mausoleum was appraised at $30,000 ($805,000 in 2021 dollars). 

In 1994, the film Assassins was filmed at the tomb. Ever since the monument was built, it has attracted attention of vandals. In 2008, the damage done to the tomb and nearby graves was appraised at $12,000 ($15,000).

Other familial historic landmarks

There a few other Everett locations that bear the Rucker family name like the Rucker Hill, Rucker Avenue, and the Rucker Mansion.

 The  Rucker Mansion, where Jane Rucker spent the last years of her life from 1905 to 1907, is considered "the boldest, biggest mansion" of old Everett buildings and "the most beautiful site in the city." The construction was appraised at $40,000 ($1,000,000 in 2021 dollars). The Rucker family owned the mansion until 1923. In 1974 or 1975, the mansion was placed on the National Register of Historic Places register.

 The Rucker Hill Historic District is a residential area above Port Gardner Bay in Everett, Washington. It was listed on the National Register of Historic Places in 1989.

Notes

References

Literature cited

External links 
 

Washington (state) pioneers
People from Everett, Washington
People from Ohio
Businesspeople from Washington (state)
Real estate and property developers
American women landowners
American industrialists
American investors
American women investors
19th-century American businesswomen
19th-century American businesspeople